Boneh Anbar (also Romanized as Boneh Ānbār; also known as Bonehānbār) is a village in Howmeh Rural District, in the Central District of Behbahan County, Khuzestan Province, Iran. At the 2006 census, its population was 23, in 4 families.

References 

Populated places in Behbahan County